Mieczysław Hryniewicz (born 31 August 1949) is a Polish actor. He has made around 40 appearances in film and television. He starred in the 1986-1987 television series Zmiennicy.

References

External links
 

1949 births
Living people
Polish male film actors